Caroline Pennell is an American singer-songwriter. She was a contestant on the fifth season of the United States version of the reality singing competition The Voice. Since 2021, she has been releasing music under the name Carol Ades.

On The Voice
At 17 years old, Pennell auditioned for the fifth season of the American series of The Voice. She turned the chairs of CeeLo Green and Blake Shelton with her blind audition singing Ellie Goulding's "Anything Could Happen." She chose Green to be her coach because "comfort is a big thing for [her], and CeeLo radiates comfort. [She] just always wanted to hug him".

In the battle rounds she battled and won against Anthony Paul, singing "As Long As You Love Me" by Justin Bieber. In the knockout round, she faced George Horga, Jr. singing Ingrid Michaelson's "The Way I Am", and won again. In the Live Rounds, she sang "We're Going to Be Friends" by the White Stripes and won a majority in the public vote. In the Top 10, she sang "Leaving on a Jet Plane" and landed in the bottom three. Before voting in the "Instant Save" system to pick one contestant in the bottom three to move forward, Pennell and Tessanne Chin performed Lorde's "Royals". Pennell was predicted to be the underdog in the bottom three, but after her performance, she received 80% of the Twitter votes, and moving on to the Top 8. The next week, she sang "Dog Days Are Over" and again landed in the bottom three. Matthew Schuler was picked on Twitter by the "Instant Save," ending Pennell's time as a contestant.

Nettwerk Music Group
Pennell announced that she would join the Nettwerk Music Group. She was featured on the album From Cover to Cover: 30 Years at Nettwerk. Her version of Coldplay's "Yellow" was one of the most downloaded songs from the album.

Discography
Pennell released her EP The Race on December 1, 2013. She wrote and co-produced all songs.

Songwriting credits

Other appearances
In addition to Coldplay's "Yellow," Pennell has also covered "Come and Get It" from the movie The Magic Christian, a song written by Paul McCartney. Her performance was featured as one of the five songs on Music for Linda, produced by Paul McCartney, sold to raise funds for Women and Cancer Fund.

She was featured on Bassjackers and Lucas and Steve's song "These Heights".

References

External links
Official website
Bandcamp page
iTunes page

The Voice (franchise) contestants
Living people
Year of birth missing (living people)
People from Saddle River, New Jersey
Ramsey High School (New Jersey) alumni
21st-century American singers
21st-century American women singers
Nettwerk Music Group artists